The white-vented violetear (Colibri serrirostris) is a species of hummingbird in the subfamily Polytminae, the mangoes. It is found in Argentina, Bolivia, Brazil, and Paraguay.

Taxonomy and systematics

The white-vented violetear is monotypic.

Description

The male is mostly shiny green, of a shade lighter than that of other violetears. Towards the rump it is yellow-green with a blue shimmer. The tail is glittering green with a wide steel-blue band near the end. The undertail coverts are pure white. The area behind the eye and covering the ears is violet blue. The female is similar to the male but paler and more grayish. The maxilla of both sexes is sometimes serrated, which provides its specific epithet.

Distribution and habitat

The white-vented violetear is found in a wide swath of southern Brazil, from Mato Grosso east to Goiás, Bahia and Espírito Santo and south to Santa Catarina. Its range extends west into Bolivia, central Paraguay, and northern Argentina as far south as Córdoba Province. It inhabits a variety of semi-open landscapes including scrublands, savanna, grassland, and gardens and parks.

Behavior

Movement

The white-vented violetear is mostly sedentary or nearly so; some populations make short migrations. Birds at elevations above treeline in Brazil are believed to move to lower elevations in fall.

Feeding

The white-vented violetear forages for nectar from a wide variety of flowering plants and trees. It also captures insects on the wing. It is very aggressive, calling from a perch and chasing other nectar-feeding birds and even butterflies from flower patches. It tends to begin feeding earlier in the day than other hummingbirds.

Breeding

The white-vented violetear's breeding seasons have not been fully defined, but in parts of Brazil it nests between September and March. The female alone builds the nest, incubates the eggs, and cares for the young. The nest is a cup made of fine fibers and spider silk and decorated with lichens on its outside. The clutch size is two eggs. The incubation time is 15 to 16 days with fledging 22 to 25 days after hatch.

Vocalization

The white-vented violetear's song is "a constantly repeated 'tsilp, tsilp, zip, tsalp, tsalp'" that may continue for 25 minutes. Its principal call is "a hard 'drüg, drüg, drüg, drüg, drüg'".

Status

The IUCN has assessed the white-vented violetear as being of Least Concern, though its population size and trend are not known. It has a large range, is common in most of it, and occurs in several protected areas.

References

External links 

Footage of birds made in Ecuador, December 2016

white-vented violetear
Birds of Brazil
Birds of Bolivia
Hummingbird species of South America
white-vented violetear
Taxa named by Louis Jean Pierre Vieillot
Taxonomy articles created by Polbot